Tetratricopeptide repeat protein 4 is a protein that in humans is encoded by the TTC4 gene.

The 34-amino acid tetratricopeptide repeat (TPR) motif is found in a variety of proteins and may mediate protein-protein or protein-membrane interactions.[supplied by OMIM]

References

Further reading